Rehabilitation International (RI Global) is an international disability rights organization with member organizations in every region of the world. The RI secretariat is located in New York City.

Founded in 1922, RI is a network of people with disabilities, service providers, government agencies, academics, researchers and advocates working to improve the quality of life of people with disabilities. A major focus of its activity since 1999 has been establishing the Convention on the Rights of Persons with Disabilities.

In the late 1960s, RI created the ubiquitous International Symbol of Access, featuring a stylized person in a wheelchair on a blue background.

Commissions 

RI maintains commissions of specialists and experts on various issues in disability. Represented by the RI Chairs and Vice Chairs, the commissions are thematic work groups which assist in developing and expanding program activities in accordance with RI's strategic goals.

RI commissions include:
 Education Commission
 Health and Function Commission
 International Commission on Technology and Accessibility (ICTA)
 Leisure, Recreation and Physical Activities Commission
 Policy and Service Commission
 Social Commission
 Work and Employment Commission

Projects 

RI works with its members, partners, experts and regional leaders to create and carry out projects with the following objectives across the globe:
 Accessibility
 Disaster Management
 Empowerment
 Rehabilitation & Habilitation
 Poverty Reduction
 Implementation of the UN CRPD

External links 
Rehabilitation International (RI)

References 

Disability rights organizations
International organizations based in the United States
Non-profit organizations based in New York (state)